Pulls Ferry is a former ferry house located on the River Wensum in Norwich, Norfolk. It is a flint building and was once a 15th-century watergate. It was the route for the stone used to build Norwich Cathedral. The stone came from Caen up the rivers Yare and Wensum. A canal, specifically built by the monks, used to run under the arch, where the Normans  ferried the stone and building materials to be unloaded on the spot.

The building is named after John Pull, who ran the ferry across the Wensum from 1796 to 1841. It was previously known as Sandling's, after a seventeenth-century predecessor. The ferry operated until 1943.

The ferry house adjoining the watergate was built in 1647. Both house and archway were restored in 1948-9 by Cecil Upcher.

References

External links
Pulls Ferry

Buildings and structures in Norwich